Billy Strings (born William Lee Apostol, October 3, 1992) is an American guitarist and bluegrass musician. He won a Grammy Award in 2021.

Early life
Billy Strings was born William Lee Apostol on October 3, 1992, in Lansing, Michigan.  His father died of a heroin overdose when he was two and his mother remarried Terry Barber, an accomplished amateur bluegrass musician. Billy regards Barber as his father. The family moved to Morehead, Kentucky, then to Muir, Michigan. While he was still a pre-teen his parents became addicted to methamphetamine. He left the family home at the age of thirteen and himself went through a period of hard-drug usage. His family eventually achieved sobriety; Billy stopped using hard drugs and drinking alcohol. 

Barber was a heavy influence on his stepson, introducing him to traditional bluegrass artists at a young age, including Doc Watson, Del McCoury, David Grisman, Bill Monroe, John Hartford, Ralph Stanley, Earl Scruggs, and Larry Sparks. Strings is also a rock and metal fan, influenced by Jimi Hendrix, Johnny Winter, Widespread Panic, Phish, Grateful Dead, Def Leppard, Between the Buried and Me, and Black Sabbath, and played in hard rock and indie rock bands in his teens.

Apostol got his stage name Billy Strings from his aunt, who saw his ability on multiple traditional bluegrass instruments.

Career

Beginnings and Turmoil & Tinfoil (2012-2019) 
In 2012, Don Julin, a mandolin player from Traverse City, Michigan, and author of Mandolin For Dummies, asked Strings to join him on a paying gig. The partnership lasted for the next four years. 

Rolling Stone magazine named Strings one of the Top Ten New Country Artists to Know in 2017. On February 12, 2018, Rolling Stone published an article entitled "Bluegrass Prodigy Billy Strings Plots 2018 Spring Tour," saying, "Billy Strings doesn't have any trouble living up to his name. [He is] one of the latest breakneck guitar pickers to emerge in the bluegrass world." The International Bluegrass Music Association awarded him with the 2016 Momentum Award for Instrumentalist of the year. Bluegrass Situation named him a scene tastemaker in 2016. Lisa Snedeker of HuffPost proclaimed Turmoil and Tinfoil as one of the best albums of 2017, writing, "in September it charted at No. 3 on the Billboard Bluegrass charts. ‘Nuff said.". In March 2018, Rolling Stone released Strings' debut music video Dealing Despair from his album Turmoil & Tinfoil. He planned to play over 200 shows in 2018.

He has been invited to play on stage with artists including Dierks Bentley, Del McCoury, Bill Kreutzmann, Bob Weir, David Grisman, Larry Keel, Sam Bush, The Marcus King Band, Greensky Bluegrass, The Infamous Stringdusters, The String Cheese Incident, Leftover Salmon, Widespread Panic and more. He has performed at festivals including Hookahville, Blue Ox, Pickathon, Merlefest, DelFest, High Sierra Music Festival, Lollapalooza, Grey Fox Bluegrass Festival, Telluride Bluegrass Festival, John Hartford Memorial Festival, Aiken Bluegrass Festival, Appaloosa Music Festival, Wheatland Music Festival, Red Wing Roots Music Festival, Bristol Rhythm & Roots, Rooster Walk, French Broad River Festival, Makers Trail Festival, Under the Big Sky Festival, and the All Good Presents 4848 Festival. At Grey Fox, he served as their very first artist in residence in 2017 and 2018. Strings has appeared on famous PBS musical TV programs Austin City Limits and Bluegrass Underground. He has toured with Greensky Bluegrass, The Infamous Stringdusters, Leftover Salmon, Cabinet and others.

In February 2017, Billy was named one of the six new rising stars of bluegrass by Acoustic Guitar magazine. He also collaborated with Molly Tuttle on the songs "Sittin' on Top of the World" and "Billy in the Lowground."

In March 2018, PBS announced that Billy was to be the inaugural performer at the new cave for the renowned series Bluegrass Underground in the caverns of Pelham, Tennessee.

Home and Renewal (2019-2021) 
In January 2019, Rolling Stone wrote an article entitled "Why Guitarist Billy Strings Is the Bluegrass Star You Don't Want to Miss." He was signed to Rounder Records in June 2019. Strings released his album, Home (produced and engineered by: Glenn Brown) under the label on September 27, 2019. It became his most successful release yet, reaching number one on the Heatseekers Albums and Bluegrass Albums charts. He also debuted at No. 11 on the Emerging Artists Chart.
On September 26, 2019, Billy Strings was voted the International Bluegrass Music Association Guitar Player of the Year in Raleigh, North Carolina.

His album Home won the Grammy for Best Bluegrass Album at the 63rd Annual Grammy Awards.

His touring band consists of Billy Failing (banjo), Royal Masat (bass),  Jarrod Walker (mandolin), and Alex Hargreaves (fiddle).

In 2021 he joined Bill Kreutzmann's Billy & the Kids for a number of shows, along with James Casey (saxophone).

As a solo artist he was inter alia part of the Newport Folk Festival in July 2021. On September 24, 2021, he released his third studio album, entitled Renewal.

Me/And/Dad (2022-present)
At the 2022 International Bluegrass Music Awards, Strings was nominated for six awards. For the second straight year, He won for Entertainer of the Year while "Red Daisy" won Song of the Year.

On October 3, 2022, Strings announced his forthcoming album Me/And/Dad is a project with his father Terry Barber.  Though not his biological father, he is a father to Strings as he credits Barber with raising him.  "Terry raised me and taught me how to wipe my ass, tie my shoes, and play guitar. That’s my fucking dad."  The album is a collection of traditional, country and bluegrass music from George Jones, Doc Watson, Hank Thompson, A.P. Carter, and others.  The album is set for release on November 18.  The same day as the album was announced, "Long Journey Home"/"Life to Go" was released as a two-song single.  Barber takes the lead vocal on the Jones-written song "Life to Go."

Discography

Albums

Studio albums

Collaborations

Extended plays

Singles

As lead artist

As featured artist

Music videos

Other appearances

Awards and nominations

Americana Music Awards 
The Americana Music Honors & Awards are awarded annually by the Americana Music Association to honor the best in Americana and American roots music. Strings has received three nominations.

|-
|2020
|Emerging Artist of the Year
|rowspan=3|Billy Strings
|
|-
|2021
|rowspan=2|Artist of the Year
|
|-
|2022
|

Grammy Awards 
The Grammy Awards are awarded annually by the National Academy of Recording Arts and Sciences. Strings has won 1 award from 3 nominations.

|-
|2021
|rowspan=2|Best Bluegrass Album
|Home
|
|-
|rowspan=2|2022
|Renewal
|
|-
|Best American Roots Performance
|"Love and Regret"
|

International Bluegrass Music Awards 
The International Bluegrass Music Awards are awarded annually by the International Bluegrass Music Association to honor the best in bluegrass. Strings has won six awards from 15 nominations.

|-
|rowspan=2|2019
|New Artist of the Year
|rowspan=4|Billy Strings
|
|-
|rowspan=2|Guitar Player of the Year
|
|-
|rowspan=4|2020
|
|-
|Entertainer of the Year
|
|-
|Album of the Year
|Home
|
|-
|Instrumental Recording of the Year
|"Guitar Peace"
|
|-
|rowspan=3|2021
|Guitar Player of the Year
|rowspan=6|Billy Strings
|
|-
|Instrumental Group of the Year
|
|-
|rowspan=2|Entertainer of the Year
|
|-
|rowspan=6|2022
|
|-
|Guitar Player of the Year
|
|-
|Instrumental Group of the Year
|
|-
|Album of the Year
|Renewal
|
|-
|Song of the Year
|"Red Daisy"
|
|-
|Instrumental Recording of the Year
|"Ice Bridges"
|

References

External links
Official website

Living people
1992 births
Grammy Award winners
Rounder Records artists
American country rock singers
American country singer-songwriters
American bluegrass musicians
Country musicians from Michigan